Terry Loder (born February 3, 1953) is a Canadian politician in Newfoundland and Labrador, Canada. He represented the district of Bay of Islands in the Newfoundland and Labrador House of Assembly from 2007 to 2011. He is a member of the Progressive Conservative Party. In the 2011 provincial election, Loder was defeated by former MHA Eddie Joyce, who reclaimed the seat.

Electoral history

References

 Terry Loder's PC Party biography

Progressive Conservative Party of Newfoundland and Labrador MHAs
Living people
1953 births
21st-century Canadian politicians
Newfoundland and Labrador municipal councillors